Xuhui High School is a secondary school in Xujiahui, Shanghai. Founded in 1850 by Jesuit missionaries, its original name was Collège Saint Ignace. After the Chinese Civil War,  was moved and rebuilt in Luzhou, New Taipei City, Taiwan.

Gallery

See also
 List of Jesuit sites

High schools in Shanghai
Xuhui District